Annabel Miguelena is a Panamanian writer, actress and lawyer.

Early life 
She was born in Chitré in 1984.

Career 
She published Amo tus pies mugrientos (El Hacedor, 2011), Punto final (UTP, 2005) and Pedacito de luna (Fundacion Buenos Vecinos, 2009). She was winner of the 2010 minicuento contest organized by the Spanish Revista Minatura and the First Mention of Premio Nacional de Cuento "José María Sánchez" 2004 organized by the Universidad Tecnológica de Panamá. 

In 2010, she wrote, produced, composed the music and acted in the play Ana Mía, which was nominated for three Premios Escena in Panama. It won Best Original Play and Best Original Song.

External links
Annabel Miguelena – Information about the author in the database maintained by the Universidad Tecnológica de Panamá (in Spanish).
miniTEXTOS.org – Short stories published in this flash fiction on-line magazine (in Spanish).

1984 births
Living people
People from Chitré
Panamanian short story writers
Panamanian women writers
Panamanian women short story writers
20th-century women writers
20th-century short story writers
20th-century Panamanian women writers
20th-century Panamanian writers
21st-century Panamanian women writers
21st-century Panamanian writers